Canadian Egg Marketing Agency v Richardson, [1998] 3 S.C.R. 157 is a decision of the Supreme Court of Canada on standing to challenge a law as a violation of the Constitution of Canada. The Court expanded the exception first established in R. v. Big M Drug Mart to allow corporations to invoke the Canadian Charter of Rights and Freedoms in civil litigation.  The corporation had claimed rights to freedom of association and freedom of movement under section 2(d) and section 6 of the Charter.

See also
 Manitoba (AG) v Manitoba Egg and Poultry Association
 Reference Re Agricultural Products Marketing
 List of Supreme Court of Canada cases (Lamer Court)

External links
 

Supreme Court of Canada cases
1998 in Canadian case law
Section Two Charter case law
Eggs (food)